The Lake Murray Meteorite, the largest of its kind ever found in Oklahoma and now ranked as the fifth largest in the world, was discovered on a farm in Carter County, Oklahoma in 1933. At that time it was considered the largest known specimen in the world. The farm was sold to the state of Oklahoma about the same time for the creation of Lake Murray State Park, for which the specimen was named. The largest piece is on display at the park.

Allen Graffham, a geologist and curator of the park's Tucker Tower museum, was interested in a more scientific study of the object. He contacted Dr. Lincoln LaPaz of the University of New Mexico about the specimen. LaPaz confirmed that it was a meteorite. He assessed that it was composed primarily of nickel and iron, and estimated that it may have weighed  when it struck, about 90 to 110 million years ago, but that oxidation had since worn away  of the surface.

LaPaz, then the director of the Institute of Meteoritics at the University,  carefully cut the specimen into two pieces. He performed additional tests and classed the specimen as octahedrite.    He wrote that it could also be an example of a hexaoctahedrite (a transition between hexahedrite and octahedrite).  A more recent  reference states that the meteorite is an iron meteorite belonging to Group IIAB, which can be classified as either a hexahedrite or a coarsest octahedrite. Chemical analysis showed that the material contained 6.3% nickel (Ni), 0.5% Phosphorus (P), 53.9 parts per million (ppm) Gallium (Ga), 141 ppm Germanium (Ge), and 0.02 ppm Iridium (Ir).

One half of the specimen was retained at Lake Murray, where it has been displayed at the Tucker Tower museum since the early 1950s.

The New England Meteoritical Service has posted several photos taken during analysis of the specimen.

References

External links
  A map that is claimed to show the location where the Lake Murray meteorite was discovered.

Meteorites found in the United States
Geology of Oklahoma
Carter County, Oklahoma